Malin Wilson (born 25 October 1994) is a Scottish international judoka. She has represented Scotland at the Commonwealth Games and won a bronze medal.

Biography
Wilson is from Ullapool but lives in Madrid. In 2017, she won silver medals at the Malaga and Dubrovnik European Opens. She became champion of Great Britain, winning the lightweight division at the British Judo Championships in 2018.

In 2022, she was selected for the 2022 Commonwealth Games in Birmingham, where she competed in the women's -57 kg, winning the bronze medal. At the 2022 British National Championships she successfully regained her -57kg title.

References

1994 births
Living people
Scottish female judoka
British female judoka
Judoka at the 2022 Commonwealth Games
Commonwealth Games competitors for Scotland
Commonwealth Games bronze medallists for Scotland
Commonwealth Games medallists in judo
Medallists at the 2022 Commonwealth Games